Matthew Woolgar (born 5 January 1976) is an English retired footballer who played for Luton Town, Baldock Town and Merthyr Tydfil.

Club career

Luton Town
Woolgar started his career with Luton Town. On 7 September 1993, he made his only appearance for Luton in the 1993–94 Anglo-Italian Cup where he replaced John Hartson in the 1–1 draw with Southend United.

Later career
Woolgar moved into non-league football following his spell with Luton and went on to play for Baldock Town and Merthyr Tydfil.

References

1976 births
Sportspeople from Bedford
Living people
Association football forwards
English footballers
Luton Town F.C. players
Baldock Town F.C. players
Merthyr Tydfil F.C. players
Footballers from Bedfordshire